Chebi may refer to:

ChEBI, Chemical Entities of Biological Interest
Chebi Khan (fl. 630-650), a claimant of the title of khan of Eastern Turkic Khaganate after the collapse of Xueyantuo
Chebi, Ethiopia, a town in Jeldu woreda, Ethiopia
Typhoon Chebi (2001)
Typhoon Chebi (2006)